Susan Reynolds Crease (November 18, 1855 – July 15, 1947) was an English-born Canadian artist and activist for women's rights.

Life 
The daughter of Sir Henry Pering Pellew Crease and Lady Sarah Lindley Crease, she was born in Antron, Cornwall and came to Victoria, British Columbia in 1860. Crease moved to New Westminster with her family in 1862, returning to Victoria six years later. She took private art lessons in Canada and England, also attending art classes at King's College in London with her sister Josephine. Crease produced a number of watercolours of Vancouver Island. She was a member of the Island Arts and Crafts Society.

From 1884 to 1933, she was a member of the local Local Council of Women and helped promote the visit of suffragist Emily Pankhurst.

The diaries of Susan and her mother, Sarah, are noted for their portrait of Victoria life at the turn of the 20th century. Crease died in Victoria at the age of 91.

Her work is included in the collection of the University of British Columbia.

References 

1855 births
1947 deaths
Artists from Victoria, British Columbia
Canadian watercolourists
Canadian landscape painters
Canadian women artists
Canadian women activists
British emigrants to Canada
Canadian people of Cornish descent
English emigrants to pre-Confederation British Columbia
Alumni of King's College London
Women watercolorists